József Szlávy de Érkenéz et Okány (23 November 1818 in Győr – 8 August 1900 Zsitvaújfalu, (today Nová Ves nad Žitavou, Slovakia)) was a Hungarian politician who served as prime minister from 1872 to 1874, as Speaker of the House of Representatives of Hungary from 3 April 1879 to 12 April 1880 and as Speaker of the House of Magnates from 19 September 1894 to 3 October 1896. He was Minister of Finance of Austria-Hungary from 1880 to 1882.

Ancestors

1818 births
1900 deaths
People from Győr
Hungarian nobility
Deák Party politicians
Liberal Party (Hungary) politicians
Prime Ministers of Hungary
Defence ministers of Hungary
Finance ministers of Hungary
Finance ministers of Austria-Hungary
Education ministers of Hungary
Agriculture ministers of Hungary
Speakers of the House of Representatives of Hungary
Speakers of the House of Magnates
19th-century Hungarian politicians
Grand Crosses of the Order of Saint Stephen of Hungary